Ochrotrigona is a genus of moths of the family Erebidae. The genus was erected by George Hampson in 1926.

Species
Ochrotrigona triangulifera (Hampson, 1895) Sikkim, Thailand, Vietnam, Peninsular Malaysia
Ochrotrigona praetextata (Hering, 1903) Borneo, Sumatra, Peninsular Malaysia

References

Calpinae